Presberg was first mentioned in 1391 as Brensbur and, since 1977, is part of the town of Rüdesheim am Rhein. It lies in Hessen and has about 860 inhabitants as of 2007. The air recreation village is situated on top of Rheingau mountains, 8 km north of the center of Rüdesheim.

References

External links 

 Website containing a lot of regional pictures and walking tours (German)
 Historisches Ortslexikon (German)

Rheingau-Taunus-Kreis
Villages in Hesse
Rheingau